Giovanni Seynhaeve (born 21 July 1976) is a retired Belgian football defender.

References

1976 births
Living people
Belgian footballers
R.E. Mouscron players
C.S. Visé players
A.F.C. Tubize players
R.R.C. Peruwelz players
Association football defenders
Belgian Pro League players
Belgian expatriate footballers
Expatriate footballers in France
Belgian expatriate sportspeople in France
Expatriate footballers in Romania
Belgian expatriate sportspeople in Romania